Yaşar is a masculine Turkish given name, which also appears as a surname. In non-Turkish publications, the name would many times appear as Yasar (with no cedilla on the s).

People with the name include:

Given name

Yaşar
 Yaşar Aliyev (born 1955), Azerbaijani diplomat
 Yaşar Altıntaş (born 1957), Turkish footballer
 Yaşar Alpaslan (1914–1995), Turkish footballer
 Yaşar Turgut Bilgin (born 1957), Turkish author 
 Yaşar Büyükanıt (1940–2019), Turkish general, Chief of the Turkish General Staff of the Turkish Armed Forces
 Yaşar Halit Çevik (born 1955), Turkish ambassador
 Yaşar Doğu (1913–1961), Turkish sports wrestler
 Yaşar Erkan (1911–1986), Turkish sports wrestler 
 Yaşar Giritli (born 1969), Turkish boxer
 Yaşar Güler (born 1954), Turkish general 
 Yasar İsmailoğlu (born 1945), Turkish-Cypriot poet, writer and journalist 
 Yaşar Kemal (1923-2015), Turkish writer and journalist of Kurdish origin
 Yaşar Kurt (born 1968), Turkish musician of Armenian origin
 Yaşar Nezihe (1882-1971), female poet from the Ottoman Period into Turkish Republic
 Yaşar Nuri Öztürk (1951–2016), Turkish politician
 Yaşar Ören (born 1942), Turkish cross-country skier
 Yaşar Topçu (born 1941), Turkish politician and government minister
 Yaşar Yakış (born 1938), Turkish politician and government minister
 Yaşar Yılmaz (born 1930), Turkish sports wrestler

Yasar
 Yasar Onel, Turkish-born Swiss and American physicist

Middle name
 Ümit Yaşar Oğuzcan (1926–1984), Turkish poet

Surname

Yaşar
 Ebru Yaşar (born 1978), Turkish female musician
 Ece Yaşar (born 1990), Turkish female karateka
 İbrahim Halil Yaşar (born 1994), Turkish footballer 
 Muhsin Yaşar, Turkish basketball player 
 Necdet Yaşar (1930–2017), Turkish tanbur (lute) player and teacher 
 Osman Yaşar, American computer scientist
 Nurettin Yaşar (born 1961), Turkish politician and member of Parliament
 Selim Yaşar (born 1990), Ingushetia-born Russian and Turkish wrestler

Yasar

 Nedim Yasar (1987–2018), Danish former gangster and radio host of Turkish origin
 Özgür Yasar (born 1981), Swedish footballer

See also
Yashar (disambiguation)

Turkish-language surnames
Turkish masculine given names